Love in the Rough is a 1930 American Pre-Code comedy film directed by Charles Reisner and written by Sarah Y. Mason, Joseph Farnham and Robert E. Hopkins. The film stars Robert Montgomery, Dorothy Jordan, Benny Rubin, J. C. Nugent, Penny Singleton and Tyrell Davis.

Also a musical, it is a remake of the 1927 silent comedy Spring Fever. The film was released on September 6, 1930, by Metro-Goldwyn-Mayer.

Plot summary

Cast
 Robert Montgomery as Kelly
 Dorothy Jordan as Marilyn
 Benny Rubin as Benny
 J. C. Nugent as Waters
 Penny Singleton as Virgie 
 Tyrell Davis as Tewksbury 
 Harry Burns as Gardener
 Allan Lane as Johnson
 Catherine Moylan as Martha
 Edwards Davis as Williams
 Roscoe Ates as Proprietor
 Clarence Wilson as	Brown
 George Chandler as Taxi Driver
 Donald Novis as Crooner

References

External links 
 
 
 
 

1930 films
Metro-Goldwyn-Mayer films
Films directed by Charles Reisner
American black-and-white films
Golf films
1930s sports comedy films
American sports comedy films
1930 comedy films
1930s English-language films
1930s American films
English-language sports comedy films